The 1816 United States presidential election in Vermont took place between November 1 to December 4, 1816, as part of the 1816 United States presidential election. 

During this election, Vermont's state legislature chose eight members of the Electoral College who would all vote for Democratic-Republican candidate and Secretary of State James Monroe for President and Governor Daniel D. Tompkins of New York for Vice President.

See also
 United States presidential elections in Vermont

References

Vermont
1816
1816 Vermont elections